DYVW (1386 AM) is a radio station owned and operated by the Voice of the Word Media Network, the media arm of the Diocese of Borongan. The station's studio is located along Baybay Blvd., Brgy. Songco, Borongan.

Last June 26, 2018, DYVW was reopened after 13 years off the air.

References

Radio stations established in 1991
Catholic radio stations
Radio stations in Eastern Samar